Ethyldichloroarsine, sometimes abbreviated "ED" and also known as ethyl Dick, is an organoarsenic compound with the formula CH3CH2AsCl2.  This colourless volatile liquid is a highly toxic obsolete vesicant or blister agent that was used during World War I in chemical warfare.  The molecule is pyramidal with the Cl-As-Cl and C-As-Cl angles approaching 90° (see image).  Ethyldichloroarsine has high chronic toxicity, similar to lewisite.

References 

Arsenical vesicants
Organoarsenic chlorides